Naver Papago (Hangul: 네이버 파파고), shortened to Papago and stylized as papago, is a multilingual machine translation cloud service provided by Naver Corporation. Unlike many other translators, Papago uses a neural machine translation to learn from its mistakes and learn what type of translations the user requires. The name "Papago" comes from the Esperanto word for "parrot", Esperanto being a constructed language.

Features
Papago ended its trial phase and officially launched on July 19, 2017 with translation options for Korean, Japanese, Chinese, English, Spanish, and French. It was only available as a smartphone app but it has since launched its own website and has expanded to other languages.

From November 2019, Papago was changed to be available without Internet service. 

In 2020, the image translation function was introduced, and text in photos can be translated directly. It supports a total of six languages, including Korean, English, Japanese, Chinese, Vietnamese, and Thai.

Main function 

 1:1 Conversation Mode: An interactive translation, translated through speech recognition.
 Image Translation: The portion of a photo in a gallery or the characters in a newly photographed picture is specified and translated into text. It is available in six languages: Korean, English, Japanese, Chinese, Vietnamese, and Thai.

Special function

WSD screen 
If a homonym is detected in a sentence to be translated, the corresponding word is underlined in the Translation Results tab via the Word Sense Disposition (WSD) function. Click on the word to display a picture that expresses various meanings in simple shapes, and by choosing the correct shapes, you can get more accurate and correct translation results. This function seems to be able to solve the chronic problem in machine translation, the processing of Chinese words, but there are many cases where the data are not underlined due to the lack of them.

Automatic conversion of exchange rate 
Using real-time exchange rate information, the current exchange rate is calculated along with the translation result.

Global conversation 
It can be used even when it is not connected to the network. All four languages are available, and you can see the original text and how to read the frequently used essential phrases depending on the situation.

Push-to-talk 
This technology allows voice recognition even in noisy environments.

Supported languages 
The following languages are supported in Naver Papago.

Chinese (Simplified)
Chinese (Traditional)
English
French
German
Hindi
Indonesian
Japanese
Korean
Portuguese
Russian
Spanish
Thai
Vietnamese
Italian

See also 

 Babelnet
 vidby

References

External links
Official website

Machine translation software
Natural language processing software
Translation websites
Naver Corporation